Beth Potter (born 27 December 1991) is a Scottish long-distance runner and triathlete competing internationally for Great Britain, and for Scotland at the Commonwealth Games. She competed for Great Britain in athletics at the 2016 Summer Olympics in Rio de Janeiro. In 2019 she won the gold medal at the European Triathlon Championships in Weert, Netherlands. In 2022, she won individual bronze at the 2022 World Triathlon Sprint Championships, and silver with Team Great Britain in the World Triathlon Mixed Relay Championships.

Potter also competes in Super League Triathlon. She won the Super League Triathlon Arena Games, London 2021, and was second at the Rotterdam event. In 2022 Potter became the first Esports Triathlon World Champion, by winning the 2022 Arena Games Triathlon series.

Early life 
Potter was born in Scotland and grew up in Bearsden, where she ran for Victoria Park Glasgow. Her father, Alex, is also a competitive runner and her sister, Sarah, is a running coach. At a young age Potter was a competitive swimmer. She attended Loughborough University. Potter moved to London for postgraduate training at Saint Mary's University.

Career

Running career 
Potter began competing as a runner in 2004. In 2008, she placed first at the Scottish Under-15 Championships in cross country and in the 1500m distance in track. She finished 36th in Under 20 cross-country at the World Championships in 2010.

Coming back from an injury, Potter placed 18th in 5,000m at the under 23 European Championships in 2013 (16th after disqualifications). Potter began training with coach Mick Woods who convinced her not to quit running. Potter was more successful in 2014 competing at the senior level, representing Scotland at Glasgow where she finished 9th in the 5,000m and 5th at the 10,000m distance. The next year she had a disappointing 2015 season due to illness.

Potter qualified to represent Great Britain at the 2016 Summer Olympics in Rio de Janeiro. She secured her place qualifying as the second British woman in the women's 10,000m behind Jess Andrews. Leading up to the Olympics, Potter trained with fellow Scot Steph Twell. Potter also worked with a sports psychologist weekly in an effort to overcome her difficulty managing stress. She competed at the 2016 Summer Olympics in Rio de Janeiro, in the women's 10,000 metres, finishing 34th.

In May 2017 Potter won the 10,000 metres at the British trials, her first race on the track since the Olympics, qualifying her for the 2017 World Athletics Championships in London.

Triathlon career 
In January 2017 Potter announced that she was planning to make a transition from athletics to triathlon with a view to competing in triathlon at the 2020 Summer Olympics, having moved to Leeds to join an elite training group including Alistair Brownlee, Jonathan Brownlee, Vicky Holland and Non Stanford, although she did also indicate that she would aim to compete in the 2017 World Athletics Championships. In June 2017 she finished third in the elite race at the Blenheim Palace Triathlon and won the elite competition at the Cardiff Triathlon.

Potter finished 4th in the 2021 Super League Triathlon Championship Series, as well as winning the Super League Triathlon Arena Games, London, and finishing second at the Rotterdam event. in 2022, Potter won Arena Games Triathlon Powered by Zwift, Munich, the first event of the new Arena Games Triathlon Powered by Zwift Esports World Championship series. Two weeks later, at Arena Games Triathlon London, she finished in 2nd place behind France's Cassandre Beaugrand At the final event of the series, held at Marina Bay Singapore, Potter finished in second place, behind Hungary's Zsanett Bragmeyer. Her second place finish, was however enough to take the overall title in the 2022 Arena Games Triathlon Series, making Potter the inaugural Esports Triathlon World Champion.

She finished in third place at SLT NEOM, the final event of the 2022 Super League Triathlon season, her podium finish at the event secured her 4th place in the series overall.

Teaching career 
In addition to training as a runner, as of June 2016 Potter was teaching physics in west London. However by the end of that year she had left her teaching post in order to concentrate on training full-time.

References

External links 
 Beth Potter at European-Athletics.org
 Beth Potter on Twitter
 

1991 births
Living people
Scottish female long-distance runners
Olympic athletes of Great Britain
Athletes (track and field) at the 2016 Summer Olympics
Scottish female triathletes
Triathletes at the 2018 Commonwealth Games
Triathletes at the 2022 Commonwealth Games
Athletes (track and field) at the 2018 Commonwealth Games
Commonwealth Games bronze medallists for Scotland
Commonwealth Games medallists in triathlon
Sportspeople from Glasgow
Sportspeople from East Dunbartonshire
People from Bearsden
Alumni of Loughborough University
Medallists at the 2022 Commonwealth Games